Andrea John is a German born dressage rider competing for Austria. Andrea represented Austria at the 2002 FEI World Equestrian Games in Jerez de la Frontera, Spain. She competed at three European Championships; in Verden 2001, Hickstead 2003 and at the 2013 European Championships in Herning.

References 

Living people
1976 births
Austrian female equestrians
Austrian dressage riders